Millers is an unincorporated community in Union Township in western Sainte Genevieve County, Missouri, United States. It is situated approximately 15 miles southwest of Ste. Genevieve. The community started out as a switch spur of the Missouri-Illinois Railroad between Weingarten and Sprott on the property of L. R. Miller.

References

Unincorporated communities in Ste. Genevieve County, Missouri
Unincorporated communities in Missouri